Azer Seyran oghlu Aliyev (born July 18, 1969) is the Azerbaijani painter, graphic artist and designer. Associate Professor of Azerbaijan State Academy of Fine Arts.

Biography 
Azer Aliyev was born on July 18, 1969, in Baku. He studied at Azerbaijan State Art School named after Azim Azimzade in 1984–1988. In 1992–1997 A. Aliyev studied at Azerbaijan State University of Culture and Arts.

Since 1992, he has worked as a designer-artist in the documentary film studio of Azerbaijan Television. Since 1993, he has participated in international and republican exhibitions. His works have been demonstrated at various exhibitions organized in Germany, Turkey, France, Italy, Russia and other countries.

A. Aliyev's works represented Azerbaijan at the 2018 "Art Shopping" International Exhibition at the Louvre Museum and at art exhibitions in Cannes and Milan.

Azer Aliyev is the member of the Union of Artists of Azerbaijan and the Union of Designers of Azerbaijan.

References 

Azerbaijani painters
1969 births
Living people